Scandal is a self-titled debut EP by American rock band Scandal, released in 1982 by Columbia Records. Although the EP was never released on CD, all five of the EP's songs along with the "Goodbye to You" B-side "All My Life" are found on the VH1 Scandal compilation album We Are the '80s (2006). An alternate photo from the same photoshoot of the EP was used for the VH1 compilation cover as well as Playlist: The Very Best of Scandal (2008), with the track listing for Playlist being identical to We Are the '80s. All five of the EP's songs can also be found on the  remastered and expanded 2014 Rock Candy Records version of Scandal's 1984 album Warrior.

The song "Win Some, Lose Some" was written in 1979 and first recorded by Bryan Adams on his 1980 self-titled  debut album.

Track listing

Personnel
Patty Smyth - vocals
Zack Smith - guitar, background vocals
Keith Mack - guitar, background vocals
Ray Gomez - guitar, background vocals
Ivan Elias - bass guitar
Frankie LaRocka - drums
Benjy King - keyboards, background vocals
Paul Shaffer - keyboards
Liz Smyth - background vocals
Rahni Kugel - background vocals

Production
Produced by Vini Poncia (tracks 1, 2, 4, and 5) and Vini Poncia and Rick Chertoff (track 3)
Associate producer, engineer: Bob Schaper
Additional engineering: Harry Spiridakis, Michael Christopher, Nicky Kalliongis

References

External links
 Discogs.com - Scandal (EP) entry

1982 debut EPs
Scandal (American band) albums
Albums produced by Rick Chertoff
Albums produced by Vini Poncia
Columbia Records EPs